Rasmus Marvits (born 14 July 1978) is a former Danish professional football defender, who last played for the Danish Superliga side Lyngby BK.

External links
Career statistics at Danmarks Radio

1978 births
Living people
Danish men's footballers
Lyngby Boldklub players
FC Nordsjælland players
Køge Boldklub players
AC Horsens players
Brønshøj Boldklub players
Danish Superliga players
People from Hvidovre Municipality
Association football defenders
Sportspeople from the Capital Region of Denmark